The 2016–17 Binghamton Bearcats women's basketball team will represent Binghamton University during the 2016–17 NCAA Division I women's basketball season. The Bearcats, led by third year head coach Linda Cimino, played their home games at Binghamton University Events Center, they were members of the America East Conference. They finished the season 14–17, 8–8 in America East play to finish in fifth place. They lost in the quarterfinals of the America East women's tournament to Hartford.

Media
All home games and conference road games will stream on either ESPN3 or AmericaEast.tv. Most road games will stream on the opponents website. All games will be broadcast on the radio on WNBF and streamed online.

Roster

Schedule

|-
!colspan=9 style="background:#006B54; color:#FFFFFF;"| Exhibition

|-
!colspan=9 style="background:#006B54; color:#FFFFFF;"| Non-conference regular season

|-
!colspan=9 style="background:#006B54; color:#FFFFFF;"| American East regular season

|-
!colspan=9 style="background:#006B54; color:#FFFFFF;"| America East Women's Tournament

See also
2016–17 Binghamton Bearcats men's basketball team

References

Binghamton Bearcats women's basketball seasons
Binghamton
Binghamton Bearcats women's basketball
Binghamton Bearcats women's basketball